Ciudad Caribia is a planned community in Venezuela, located to the west of Caracas.

The city has kindergartens and schools, an adult education programme, football and basketball pitches, a government-run health centre, a government-subsidised bakery and supermarket, and even an industrial area, which is yet to be developed fully.  This is in stark difference to the majority of slums in the hills that surround Caracas, where people live in precarious shacks and have long commutes to work.

History
The idea for developing a new city was developed by President Hugo Chávez in 2006, with the site chosen by Chávez following a malfunction that forced the helicopter he was travelling in to land in the area. It was named after the native Carib people.

The city is planned to have 20,000 residential units. The total population is expected to be over 100,000, and had reached 10,000 by 2014. Several dwellings were given to Venezuelan citizens made homeless by flooding in November 2010. By 2011 development costs had reached $674 million.

Ciudad Caribia was one of the few places in Venezuela where support for the post-Chavez socialist government remained strong.  Despite economic crises and anti-government protests that rocked Venezuela during the 2010s, residents of this socialist city maintained unshaken faith in President Chavez's Bolivarian revolution.

References

Populated places in Vargas (state)
Planned communities